Assassins: Assignment:Jerusalem, Target:Antichrist is the sixth book in the Left Behind series. It was written by Tim LaHaye and Jerry B. Jenkins in 1999. It was released in August 1999 and was on The New York Times Best Seller List for 39 weeks. It takes place 38–42 months into the Tribulation.

Plot introduction
The book begins with protagonist Rayford Steele contemplating killing Global Community Supreme Potentate and Antichrist Nicolae Carpathia.

The prologue is the last three pages of Apollyon.

Plot summary
Rayford, filled with rage over so many losses, contemplates killing Nicolae Carpathia. He is so obsessed with the idea that he becomes stern and short tempered at times. At the New Babylon palace, David is placed in charge of delivering 144 computers to Nicolae, but diverts the delivery by telling the pilots one location and filling out the paperwork for another location. Floyd Charles reveals that he was infected from delivering Hattie's stillborn child and goes to the hospital where Leah Rose works. While on the run from Global Community (GC) forces, Floyd Charles succumbs to the poison and dies. The International CO-OP is up and running, which will allow believers to trade when it becomes illegal to buy and sell without the Mark of the Beast.

Rayford is still wondering if he might be the one to kill Nicolae. Hattie (who also wants to kill Nicolae) runs off after an incident with Floyd. Rayford and the newest member of the Trib Force, Leah Rose, a nurse from Arthur Young Memorial Hospital in Palatine, are trying to retrieve a large quantity of cash from Leah's safe when the Sixth Trumpet Judgment hits as prophesied in Revelation 9:13-19, where a plague of death by fire, smoke, sulphur and deadly snake strikes carried out by 200 million demonic horsemen, visible only to the Tribulation saints, attack nonbelievers. Ray and Leah run into GC Peacekeeping forces and the horsemen, heading back to the safe house with the cash as the Peacekeepers are killed.

David Hassid meanwhile successfully gets the computers incorrectly delivered. He also introduces the Condor cargo chief and his love interest, Annie Christopher, to Mac. On a diplomatic trip to Sudan, the sub-potentate of the region sends assassins to blow up the Condor and kill those aboard, believing Carpathia is on too. Mac and Abdullah Smith, his new copilot and a believer, save Leon Fortunato. The assassins are killed by the demonic horsemen. The Condor is replaced by the "Phoenix 216", the former plane of Pontifex Maximus Peter Mathews, head of Enigma Babylon One World Faith. The GC plans a gala for the midpoint of the Tribulation and their covenant with Israel in Jerusalem.

Rayford uses cruel methods to get Bo Hanson to tell him where Hattie went. With the help of friends Mac made in Africa, he jets off to France to rescue her, only to be almost killed in a gunfight. In reality, the pilot had been murdered and Hattie taken to the Belgium Facility for Female Rehabilitation (BFFR, or Buffer). Rayford, Buck, and Leah leave for various missions 4 months later, at Gala Week: Leah to investigate in Belgium and hopefully free Hattie, Buck to witness the events of the week for his cyberzine The Truth, and Rayford supposedly to transport everyone but secretly also hoping to shoot Carpathia.

The Tribulation hurtles to its midpoint as the four murders prophesied in scripture take place. Peter Matthews is murdered by the 10 sub-pontentates of the world. Carpathia personally kills the Two Witnesses with a gun similar to the one Rayford buys to kill him. The Witnesses later protagonize a dramatic resurrection as they are taken up into the clouds, which is dismissed by the media as a hoax. After they are resurrected, an earthquake breaks out, destroying one tenth of Israel and leaving seven thousand dead, as prophesied in Revelation 11:11-13. Finally, Carpathia himself is assassinated as prophesied in Revelation 13:3-4 while delivering a speech three days before the midpoint of the tribulation. Rayford is skeptical as to whether he really was the one who did the deed as he planned to. A hole in Carpathia's head is the same size that Rayford would expect his gun to make, but he was bumped from behind a split second before pulling the trigger. And there were several people near him who are just as suspect. In a brief flashforward to the day before the Potentate's burial, it is revealed that the assassin was caught on video camera and David Hassid is clearly surprised by what the tape reveals.

Characters
Chloe Steele Williams
Dr. Tsion Ben-Judah
David Hassid
Annie Christopher
Mac McCullum
Supreme Potentate Nicolae Carpathia, dies in this book
Supreme Commander Leon Fortunato
Dr. Chaim Rosenzweig
Hattie Durham
Leah Rose
Tyrola "T" Mark Delanty, owner of Palwaukee Airport
Dr. Floyd Charles M.D., dies in this book
Kenny Bruce Williams
Peter Mathews, dies in this book
Mr. and Mrs. (Lukas) Laslos Miklos

References

Left Behind series
1999 American novels
American post-apocalyptic novels
Novels set in Belgium
Novels set in Chicago
Novels set in Greece
Novels set in Iraq
Novels set in Jerusalem
Novels set in Sudan